Jamalaye Jibanta Manush is a 1958 Indian Bengali-language romantic comedy film directed by Prafulla Chakraborty and produced by Ananta Singh, member of Chittagong armoury raid. This film, based on the novel of Dinabandhu Mitra in the same name, was released in 1958 in the banner of Rajkumari Chitramandir. It was remade in 1960 as Devanthakudu in Telugu and in Tamil as Naan Kanda Sorgam by C. Pullayya.

Plot 
Village boy Siddheswar (alias Sidhu) loves Madhuri, the daughter of Hari. Hari, the rich village headman, will never accept Sidhu as a son-in-law. When they decide to marry, Hari sends some henchmen who almost murder Sidhu. Shocked, Madhuri commits suicide and Sidhu is mistakenly sent to hell while he is still alive. He starts a revolution in hell and heaven, and chases the Hindu God of Death, Yamraj and Chitragupta out of hell with the help of his dead pet bull. He eradicates outdated rules and norms that were framed by Yamraj, and his head clerk Chitragupta, while Bichitragupta assists him. Thereafter, Vishnu and Lakshmi come to Sidhu and Vishnu blesses him and returns him back to Earth with his beloved Madhuri. Hari accepts them gladly.

Cast 
 Bhanu Banerjee as Sidhu.
 Basabi Nandi as Madhuri
 Chhabi Biswas as Harinarayan
 Pahari Sanyal
 Kamal Mitra as Yamraj
 Tulsi Chakraborty
 Jahor Roy as Bichitragupta
 Haridhan Mukherjee
 Shyam Laha
 Nripati Chattopadhyay
 JIben Bose as Lalu
 Aparna Devi
 Ajit Chatterjee
 Suvojit Saha as Gamer

References

External links 
 

1950s Bengali-language films
1950s fantasy comedy films
1958 films
1958 romantic comedy films
Bengali films remade in other languages
Bengali-language Indian films
Films based on Indian novels
Indian fantasy comedy films